Douglas Mesner, better known as Lucien Greaves, is a social activist and the spokesman and co-founder (alongside Malcolm Jarry) of The Satanic Temple.

Biography 
Greaves was born in Detroit, Michigan, United States. His mother was a Protestant who took him to Sunday School. He studied neuroscience with a speciality in false-memory syndrome.

Greaves has spoken on the topics of Satanism, secularism, and The Satanic Temple at universities throughout the United States, and he has been a featured speaker at national conferences hosted by American Atheists, the American Humanist Association, and the Secular Student Alliance.

Greaves has been instrumental in setting up the Protect Children Project, the After School Satan project, and several political demonstrations and legal actions designed to highlight social issues involving religious liberty and the separation of church and state.

He says he has received many death threats, and deliberately does not use his legal name to avoid threats to his family.

In an interview, Greaves describes how the idea for The Satanic Temple was conceived. Greaves and his colleagues envisioned The Satanic Temple as a "poison pill" in the Church/State debate. Their idea was that Satanists, asserting their rights and privileges where religious agendas have been successful in imposing themselves upon public affairs, could serve as a reminder that such privileges are for everybody, and can be used to serve an agenda beyond the current narrow understanding of a religious agenda. Greaves does not worship Satan, nor do followers of The Satanic Temple; rather contemporary Satanic beliefs focus on personal sovereignty, independence, and freedom of will.

Greaves was prominently featured in the 2019 documentary film Hail Satan? about The Satanic Temple and religious freedom. Greaves wrote the foreword to The Little Book of Satanism by La Carmina, published October 25, 2022 by Simon & Schuster.

References

External links 

 Lucien Greaves Archive
 The Process Is... group blog, primarily 2008-2013

Living people
Year of birth missing (living people)
Religious leaders from Michigan
American Satanists
Satanist religious leaders
The Satanic Temple
Founders of new religious movements
Harvard University alumni
Activists from Michigan